Flight of the Gibbon is the first zipline tour operator in Thailand, located in Mae Kham Pong (near Chiang Mai) and Chonburi (near Bangkok and Pattaya). The company is particularly known for its original 33 platform course through the Thai jungle that includes Asia's longest single flight. As of 2019, there has been several injuries and a death on the zipline attraction.

References 

Tourist attractions in Chiang Mai province
Tourist attractions in Chonburi province
Zip-lining